Roberto De Simone (born 25 August 1933) is an Italian stage director, playwright, composer and ethnomusicologist.

Life and career 
Born in Naples, after graduating in piano and composition at the San Pietro a Maiella Conservatory De Simone started an intense concert activity, performing as an harpsichordist in the Domenico Scarlatti Orchestra. At the same time he started being active as an ethnomusical researcher and essayist, mainly focused on the southern Italy folk music of oral tradition, with also some interest in tarantism and funeral laments. In the second half of the 1960s he met some musicians who shared with him an interest in traditional music, and this encounter led to the foundation of the Nuova Compagnia di Canto Popolare, with whom De Simone collaborated for a decade.

In 1976 he made his debut as a playwright (also serving as librettist, composer and director) with the stage musical La Gatta Cenerentola, which was first staged at the Festival dei Due Mondi in Spoleto and later enjoyed national and international success. Other notable stage works include Mistero napoletano, L'Opera buffa del Giovedì Santo, and Stabat Mater. 
He served as artistic director of the San Carlo Theatre in Naples and director of the Naples Conservatory. He also composed several film scores.

References

External links 

 

1933 births
Living people
People from Naples
Italian theatre directors
Italian dramatists and playwrights
Italian musicologists
Italian male composers
Italian film score composers
Ethnomusicologists